Kanelwan is a village in Bijbehara tehsil in the Anantnag district of Jammu and Kashmir, India. The population was 3,822 in the 2011 Indian census.

Education
PS Naidpora Kanelwan Bijbehara, a government primary school is located in Kanelwan. There is also a Government High School in this area.

References

Villages in Anantnag district